This is the list of cathedrals in Panama sorted by denomination.

Roman Catholic 
Cathedrals of the Roman Catholic Church in Panama:
 Cathedral of Our Lady of Carmel in Bocas del Toro
 Cathedral of St. John Baptist in Chitré
 Cathedral of the Immaculate Conception of Mary in Colón
 Cathedral of Metetí
 Cathedral of St. Joseph in David
 Metropolitan Cathedral of St. Mary in Panama City
 Cathedral of St. John Baptist in Penonomé
 Cathedral of St. James the Apostle in Santiago de Veraguas

Anglican
Cathedrals of the Anglican Church in Central America:
 Catedral San Lucas in Panama City

See also
Lists of cathedrals

References

Churches in Panama
Religious buildings and structures in Panama
Panama
Cathedrals
Cathedrals